Jason Barker (born 1971) is a British theorist of contemporary French philosophy, film director, screenwriter, and producer. He is a professor of cultural studies at Kyung Hee University in the Graduate School of British and American Language and Culture, and visiting professor at the European Graduate School, where he teaches in the Faculty of Media and Communication alongside Alain Badiou, Judith Butler, Jacques Rancière, Avital Ronell, Slavoj Žižek, and others. 

Most notable for his translation and introductions to the philosophy of Alain Badiou, Barker draws on an eclectic range of influences including neoplatonism, Lacanian psychoanalysis, and Marxism. Writing in both the English and French languages, Barker has also contributed to debates in post-Marxism.

Early life 
Barker was born in London, England.  He studied at the Surrey Institute of Art & Design, University College, and graduated with a degree in media studies in 1995. He then studied philosophy at Cardiff University, obtaining a PhD in 2003.

Karl Marx
In an article published in The Guardian in February 2012, Barker criticised the selective interpretation of Karl Marx's writings by economists such as Nouriel Roubini (who declared: "Karl Marx was right") when responding to the global recession. According to Barker, such interpretations water down the revolutionary aspects of Marx's ideas and focus unduly on their reformist tendencies.

Writing in The New York Times on the occasion of the Marx bicentennial anniversary, Barker argued: "The key factor in Marx’s intellectual legacy in our present-day society is not 'philosophy' but 'critique,' or what he described in 1843 as 'the ruthless criticism of all that exists: ruthless both in the sense of not being afraid of the results it arrives at and in the sense of being just as little afraid of conflict with the powers that be'".

Marx Returns 
Barker is the author of Marx Returns. The story focuses on the life of Karl Marx and his struggle to write his major work on political economy, Capital. Philosopher Ray Brassier described it as "[c]urious, funny, perplexing, and irreverent". According to Nina Power, reviewing the work in the Los Angeles Review of Books, Marx Returns is "an imaginative, uplifting, and sometimes disturbing alternative history".

Marx Reloaded 
Barker is the writer, director and producer of the 2011 partly animated documentary film Marx Reloaded, which considers the relevance of Marx's ideas in the aftermath of the global economic and financial crisis of 2008—2009. The film includes interviews with several distinguished philosophers including Michael Hardt, Antonio Negri, Nina Power, Jacques Rancière, John N. Gray, Alberto Toscano, Peter Sloterdijk and Slavoj Žižek.

The London Evening Standard cited the film alongside the 2012 re-edition of The Communist Manifesto and Owen Jones' best-selling book Chavs: The Demonization of the Working Class as evidence of a resurgence of left-wing ideas.

British philosopher Simon Critchley has described Marx Reloaded as "a great introduction to Marx for a new generation" while German political scientist Herfried Münkler has called it "the type of film that Marx himself would have approved of".

Select bibliography

Nonfiction works 
 Alain Badiou: A Critical Introduction, London: Pluto Press, 2002, .

Fiction works 
 Marx Returns, Winchester: Zero Books, 2018, .

Edited works 
 맑스 재장전: 자본주의와 코뮤니즘에 관한 대담/Marx Reloaded. Interviews on Capitalism and Communism, Seoul: Nanjang Publishing House, 2013. .
 Other Althussers. Special issue of diacritics, with G. M. Goshgarian (Vol. 43.2, 2015), .
 Marginal Thinking: A Forum on Louis Althusser, Los Angeles Review of Books, May 15, 2016 online.

As translator 
 Alain Badiou, Metapolitics, trans. and with an introduction by Jason Barker, London: Verso Books, 2005, .

Articles 
 "The Topology of Revolution" in Communication and Cognition (Vol. 36, no. 1/2, 2003), .
 "Principles of Equality: on Alain Badiou's Manifesto for Philosophy, Deleuze: The Clamor of Being, and Ethics. An Essay on the Understanding of Evil" in Historical Materialism (No. 12.1, 2004), . 
 "Topography and Structure" in Polygraph (no. 17, 2005), .
 "Nous, Les Sans-Marxisme" in Gilles Grelet (ed.), Théorie-rébellion: Un Ultimatum, Paris: L’Harmattan, 2005, .
 "Nothing Personal: From the State to the Master" in Prelom (no. 8, 2006), .
 "De L'État au Maître: Badiou et le post-marxisme" in Bruno Besana et Oliver Feltham (eds.) Ecrits Autour de la Pensée d’Alain Badiou, Paris: L’Harmattan, 2006, .
 “Wherefore Art Thou Philosophy? Badiou without Badiou” in Cosmos and History: The Journal of Natural and Social Philosophy (Vol. 8.1, 2012), .
 "Master Signifier: A Brief Genealogy of Lacano-Maoism" in Filozofia (Vol. 69, no. 9, 2014), .
"Epic or Tragedy? Karl Marx and Poetic Form in The Communist Manifesto" in Filozofia 71, 2016, No. 4, pp. 316–327.

Filmography 
 Marx Reloaded. A Film by Jason Barker. Germany/UK: 2010. Medea Film – Irene Höfer/Films Noirs/ZDF/Arte; 52 minutes.

See also 
 Marx Reloaded
 Marx Returns

References

External links 
 Jason Barker's page at Los Angeles Review of Books website
 Jason Barker's page at The Guardian website 
 
 Interview in New Left Project
 Marx Reloaded trailer at YouTube

Living people
Academics from London
Alumni of Cardiff University
Alumni of the University for the Creative Arts
British film directors
Continental philosophers
French philosophy
21st-century British philosophers
21st-century British translators
British male writers
Male non-fiction writers
1971 births